John William Fordham Johnson (28 November 1866 – 28 November 1938) was a Canadian businessman and the 14th Lieutenant Governor of British Columbia.

Johnson was born in Spalding, Lincolnshire, England.  He left the United Kingdom in 1888 and settled in Portland, Oregon where he worked for a bank. Ten years later, Johnson transferred to the Vancouver office of the bank. In 1900, Johnson quit and went to work for the B.C. Sugar Co., ultimately becoming president of that company in 1920.

Johnson was appointed as the Lieutenant Governor of British Columbia in 1931. He was sworn into office on August 1 of that year and served in the role until 1936. Johnson retired from the office in ill health and died in Vancouver two years later.

Sources

External links
Biography on Lieutenant-Governor of British Columbia website.

1866 births
1938 deaths
Lieutenant Governors of British Columbia
People from Spalding, Lincolnshire